Van Vleck House and Gardens is a former private estate run as a non-profit community resource in Montclair in Essex County, New Jersey, United States. It features a public botanical garden of mostly ericaceous plants that has been developed over several generations. The display of rhododendrons and azaleas shows numerous hybrids, several named after members of the Van Vleck family.

The property had been in the hands of the Van Vleck family until 1993 when it was turned over to The Montclair Foundation. The main house, built in 1916 by Joseph Van Vleck Jr. as a Mediterranean villa, is available for events by non-profit organizations. A Chinese wisteria that was  planted in 1939 climbs around the pillars of the back portico.

Gallery

External links
 Official site

See also

 Howard Van Vleck Arboretum

Botanical gardens in New Jersey
Houses in Essex County, New Jersey
Montclair, New Jersey
Tourist attractions in Essex County, New Jersey